Robert Carlisle may refer to:

Robert Carlisle (died c.1425), MP for Carlisle
Robert Carlisle (died 1433), MP for Carlisle
Robert Carlisle (editor), see Punch Drunks
Robert Carlisle (ranchero), owner of Rancho Santa Ana del Chino who died in the shoot out with the King brothers 
Robert "Bob" Carlisle, an American singer

See also
Robert Carlyle, actor
Robert Warrand Carlyle, civil servant